Hemimellitic acid (benzene-1,2,3-tricarboxylic acid) is an organic compound with the molecular formula C6H3(СО2Н)3. Like the other isomers of benzenetricarboxylic acid, hemimellitic acid is a colorless solid.  It is prepared by oxidation of 1,2,3-trimethylbenzene.

Isomers
 Trimellitic acid (benzene-1,2,4-tricarboxylic acid)
 Trimesic acid (benzene-1,3,5-tricarboxylic acid)

References

Tricarboxylic acids
Benzoic acids